Eric Oteng (born 20 October 2001) is a Ghanaian professional footballer who plays for Las Vegas Lights FC in the USL Championship.

Club career

Right to Dream Academy

Born in Accra, Oteng started his youth career with the Right to Dream Academy.

FC Nordsjælland

Oteng then joined the Danish side Nordsjælland U19.

Ilves

Before the 2021 season, Oteng joined the Finish team Ilves. He scored 5 goals over two seasons at the club. He scored his first goal against FC Lahti. He won the Player of the Month award.

Las Vegas Lights FC
On January 31, 2023, Oteng joined American team Las Vegas Lights.

References

2001 births
Living people
Association football midfielders
Ghanaian footballers
USL Championship players
Las Vegas Lights FC players